Catocala sinyaevi is a moth in the family Erebidae first described by Andreĭ Valentinovich Sviridov in 2004. It is found in central China.

References

sinyaevi
Moths described in 2004
Moths of Asia